Nichita Moțpan (born 17 July 2001) is a Moldovan professional footballer who plays as a midfielder for CSF Bălți and the Moldova national team.

Club career
Moțpan was born in Bălți, Moldova. Between 2017 and 2020, he played youth football at Rubin Kazan and Zaria Bălți. He started his senior career with FC Bălți in July 2020, where he took part in the club's promotion from the 2020–21 Moldovan "A" Division, scoring 13 goals. In March 2021, he was close to moving to Polish side GKS Bełchatów, but the transfer fell through as FC Bălți and Moțpan could not agree on the financial terms with Bełchatów. On 1 July 2021, he made his Moldovan National Division debut in a 1–0 win against Sheriff Tiraspol. In June 2022, he moved to Israeli Premier League side Hapoel Haifa on a one-year loan. He returned to Bălți on 1 January 2023, as Hapoel opted not to extend the loan.

International career
He has represented Moldova at under-17 and under-21 level. On 10 June 2022, he made his senior international debut for the country in a 2022–23 UEFA Nations League D match against Latvia. He scored one of the goals in a 4–2 loss.

International goals
Scores and results list Moldova's goal tally first.

Notes

References

2001 births
Living people
Moldovan footballers
CSF Bălți players
Hapoel Haifa F.C. players
Moldovan Super Liga players
Israeli Premier League players
Sportspeople from Bălți
Moldovan expatriate footballers
Expatriate footballers in Israel
Moldovan expatriate sportspeople in Israel
Moldova youth international footballers
Moldova under-21 international footballers
Moldova international footballers
Association football midfielders